This is a list of 283 species in Heilipus, a genus of pine weevils in the family Curculionidae.

Heilipus species

 Heilipus acatium Boheman, 1835 c
 Heilipus acutissimus Boheman, 1843 c
 Heilipus adjectus Hustache, 1938 c
 Heilipus admixtus Hustache, 1938 c
 Heilipus affinis Guérin-Méneville, 1844 c
 Heilipus ahrensii Boheman, 1843 c
 Heilipus alternans Guérin-Méneville, 1844 c
 Heilipus amictus Hustache, 1938 c
 Heilipus anguliferus Boheman, 1843 c
 Heilipus annuliger Schoenherr, 1843 c
 Heilipus apiatus (Olivier, 1807) i c b  (avocado weevil)
 Heilipus argentinicus Heller, 1921 c
 Heilipus arrogans Pascoe, F.P., 1889 c
 Heilipus ascius Germar, 1824 c
 Heilipus asperulus Erichson, 1847 c
 Heilipus audouini Boheman, 1835 c
 Heilipus aurantiaco-cinctus Lucas in Castelnau, 1859 c
 Heilipus baiulus Erichson, 1847 c
 Heilipus balteatus Boheman, 1843 c
 Heilipus bartelsi Boheman, 1835 c
 Heilipus bellicosus Schoenherr, 1835 c
 Heilipus bidentatus Guérin-Méneville, 1844 c
 Heilipus bifurcatus Hustache, 1938 c
 Heilipus bimaculatus Boheman, 1843 c
 Heilipus binotatus Dejean, 1830 c
 Heilipus bioculatus Boheman, 1843 c
 Heilipus biplagiatus Boheman, 1843 c
 Heilipus bipunctatus Boheman, 1843 c
 Heilipus bisignatus Dejean, 1830 c
 Heilipus bistigma Hustache, 1938 c
 Heilipus bohemani Boheman, 1843 c
 Heilipus bohemanii Guérin-Méneville, 1844 c
 Heilipus boliviensis Hustache, 1924 c
 Heilipus bonelli Boheman, 1835 c
 Heilipus brevicornis Hustache, 1938 c
 Heilipus brunneus Boheman, 1835 c
 Heilipus buquetii Guérin-Méneville, 1844 c
 Heilipus cadivus Germar, 1824 c
 Heilipus callosus Boheman, 1843 c
 Heilipus carinifrons Hustache, 1930 c
 Heilipus carinirostris Boheman, 1835 c
 Heilipus catagraphus Germar, 1824 c
 Heilipus caudatus Sturm, 1826 c
 Heilipus cauterius Boheman, 1843 c
 Heilipus celsus Boheman, 1835 c
 Heilipus cestatus Boheman, 1835 c
 Heilipus championi Marshall, 1930 c
 Heilipus chevrolatii Guérin-Méneville, 1844 c
 Heilipus choicus Schoenherr, 1835 c
 Heilipus clavipes Schoenherr, 1825 c
 Heilipus colon Cristofori & Jan, 1832 c
 Heilipus commaculatus Boheman, 1835 c
 Heilipus comtus Boheman, 1843 c
 Heilipus conspersus Schoenherr, 1835 c
 Heilipus contaminatus Boheman, 1843 c
 Heilipus coronatus Boheman, 1835 c
 Heilipus corruptor Boheman, 1835 c
 Heilipus costalis Boheman, 1835 c
 Heilipus costirostris Boheman, 1835 c
 Heilipus crassirostris Guérin-Méneville, 1844 c
 Heilipus cribratus Dejean, c
 Heilipus crispus Boheman, 1843 c
 Heilipus crocopelmus Boheman, 1843 c
 Heilipus cruciatus Chevrolat, 1833 c
 Heilipus cultripes Erichson, 1847 c
 Heilipus cuvieri Boheman, 1843 c
 Heilipus cylindripennis Hustache, 1924 c
 Heilipus cymba Boheman, 1835 c
 Heilipus dahlbomi Boheman, 1835 c
 Heilipus decipiens Dejean, 1830 c
 Heilipus decussatus Boheman, 1843 c
 Heilipus degeeri Boheman, 1835 c
 Heilipus deletangi Hustache, 1924 c
 Heilipus delicatulus Hustache, 1938 c
 Heilipus destructor Schoenherr, 1835 c
 Heilipus difficilis Boheman, 1837 c
 Heilipus dimidiatus Boheman, 1835 c
 Heilipus discoides Schoenherr, 1843 c
 Heilipus dorbignyi Guérin-Méneville, 1844 c
 Heilipus dorsalis Sturm, 1826 c
 Heilipus dorsosulcatus Boheman, 1843 c
 Heilipus dorsualis Boheman, 1835 c
 Heilipus draco Schoenherr, 1843 c
 Heilipus echinatus Boheman, 1835 c
 Heilipus egenus Boheman, 1835 c
 Heilipus elegans Guérin-Méneville, 1844 c
 Heilipus elongatus Rheinheimer, 2012 g
 Heilipus erythrocephalus Boheman, 1843 c
 Heilipus erythropus Dejean, c
 Heilipus erythrorhynchus Schoenherr, 1826 c
 Heilipus erythrorrhynchus Germar, E.F., 1824 c
 Heilipus erytrocephalus Boheman, 1843 c
 Heilipus esmarki Boheman, C.H. in Schönherr, C.J., 1843 c
 Heilipus esmarkii Boheman, 1843 c
 Heilipus fahraei Boheman, 1836 c
 Heilipus faldermanni Boheman, 1835 c
 Heilipus fallax Boheman, 1843 c
 Heilipus falsus Hustache, 1938 c
 Heilipus famulus Boheman, 1843 c
 Heilipus fasciculatus Boheman, 1843 c
 Heilipus flammiger Schoenherr, 1835 c
 Heilipus fohraei Boheman, 1835 c
 Heilipus fossilis Thomson J., 1859 c
 Heilipus freyreissi Boheman, 1835 c
 Heilipus friesi Boheman, C.H. in Schönherr, C.J., 1836 c
 Heilipus friesii Boheman, 1835 c
 Heilipus gayi Boheman, 1843 c
 Heilipus germari Boheman, 1835 c
 Heilipus gibbus  g
 Heilipus gistelii Gistel, 1848 c
 Heilipus globulicollis Boheman, 1843 c
 Heilipus granellus Boheman, 1843 c
 Heilipus granicostatus Boheman, 1843 c
 Heilipus granosus Klug, 1850 c
 Heilipus granulifer Boheman, 1843 c
 Heilipus granulospinosus Brèthes, 1920 c
 Heilipus guttatus Boheman, 1843 c
 Heilipus guyanensis Hustache, 1938 c
 Heilipus gyllenhalii Guérin-Méneville, 1844 c
 Heilipus honestus Cristofori & Jan, 1832 c
 Heilipus hopei Boheman, 1843 c
 Heilipus hummeli Boheman, 1835 c
 Heilipus hylobioides Boheman, 1843 c
 Heilipus illigeri Boheman, 1835 c
 Heilipus immundus Kirsch, T., 1868 c
 Heilipus inaequalis Boheman, 1835 c
 Heilipus inclusus Hustache, 1938 c
 Heilipus ineptus Boheman, 1835 c
 Heilipus integellus Boheman, 1843 c
 Heilipus interstinctus Boheman, 1843 c
 Heilipus intricatus Boheman, 1835 c
 Heilipus jocosus Boheman, 1835 c
 Heilipus lacordairei Boheman, 1843 c
 Heilipus lactarius Germar, 1824 c
 Heilipus laetabilis Schoenherr, 1843 c
 Heilipus laevicollis Boheman, 1843 c
 Heilipus laqueatus Erichson, 1847 c
 Heilipus lateralis Schoenherr, 1835 c
 Heilipus latro Gyllenhal, 1835 c
 Heilipus lauri Boheman, 1845 i c
 Heilipus lembunculus Boheman, 1835 c
 Heilipus leoninus Boheman, 1843 c
 Heilipus leopardus Boheman, 1835 c
 Heilipus letabilis Boheman, 1843 c
 Heilipus leucomelanostigma Boheman, 1843 c
 Heilipus leucomelas Klug, c
 Heilipus lituratus Boheman, 1843 c
 Heilipus loricatus Boheman, 1843 c
 Heilipus ludiosus Marshall, 1952 c
 Heilipus maculosus Boheman, 1835 c
 Heilipus margaritifer Boheman, 1843 c
 Heilipus marginalis Dejean, c
 Heilipus marklini Boheman, 1835 c
 Heilipus marmoratus Schoenherr, 1843 c
 Heilipus marmoreus Schoenherr, 1843 c
 Heilipus medioximus Boheman, 1843 c
 Heilipus melanopus Perty, 1832 c
 Heilipus meles Boheman, 1843 c
 Heilipus mendozensis Hustache, 1938 c
 Heilipus menetriesi Boheman, 1835 c
 Heilipus miliaris Pascoe, F.P., 1881 c
 Heilipus mixtus Blanchard, 1846 c
 Heilipus moestificus Boheman, 1835 c
 Heilipus mortuus Thomson, J., 1859 c
 Heilipus multigutattus Schoenherr, 1825 c
 Heilipus multiguttatus Dejean, 1830 c
 Heilipus multipunctatus Erichson, 1847 c
 Heilipus multisignatus Boheman, 1835 c
 Heilipus muricatus Boheman, 1835 c
 Heilipus myops Boheman, 1835 c
 Heilipus naevulus Mannerheim, 1835 c
 Heilipus nisseri Boheman, 1835 c
 Heilipus nodifer Boheman, 1843 c
 Heilipus norrisii Guérin-Méneville, 1844 c
 Heilipus nubilosus Boheman, 1835 c
 Heilipus obliquus Boheman, 1843 c
 Heilipus occultus Pascoe, F.P., 1881 c
 Heilipus ocellatus Schoenherr, 1835 c
 Heilipus ochraceofasciatus Hustache, 1938 c
 Heilipus ochrifer Boheman, 1843 c
 Heilipus oculatus Schoenherr, 1826 c
 Heilipus odoratus Vanin & Gaiger, 2005 c
 Heilipus okeni Boheman, 1835 c
 Heilipus onychinus Schoenherr, 1825 c
 Heilipus osculatii Guérin, 1855 g
 Heilipus paleoliferus Boheman, 1843 c
 Heilipus pantherinus Dejean, 1835 c
 Heilipus panzeri Boheman, 1843 c
 Heilipus parcus Boheman, 1843 c
 Heilipus pardus Schoenherr, 1843 c
 Heilipus parvulus Boheman, 1843 c
 Heilipus peplus Guerin-Meneville, 1833 c
 Heilipus perseae Barber, 1920 c
 Heilipus perturbatus Boheman, 1843 c
 Heilipus pertyi Schoenherr, 1843 c
 Heilipus piceirostris Hustache, 1938 c
 Heilipus picticollis Champion, 1925 c
 Heilipus picturatus Schoenherr, 1835 c
 Heilipus pictus Boheman, 1835 c
 Heilipus pissodeoides Boheman, 1835 c
 Heilipus pittieri Barber, 1919 i c
 Heilipus plagiatus Boheman, 1843 c
 Heilipus planiusculus Perty, 1832 c
 Heilipus polycoccus Boheman, 1835 c
 Heilipus polyguttatus Hustache, 1938 c
 Heilipus polymitus Schoenherr, 1825 c
 Heilipus potentator Germar, c
 Heilipus prodigialis Schoenherr, 1825 c
 Heilipus prolixus Erichson, 1847 c
 Heilipus punctatoscabratus Boheman, 1843 c
 Heilipus punctatus Boheman, 1835 c
 Heilipus pupillatus Dejean, 1830 c
 Heilipus pusio Boheman, 1835 c
 Heilipus querulus Boheman, 1835 c
 Heilipus reichenbachi Boheman, 1843 c
 Heilipus retusus Boheman, 1835 c
 Heilipus roeseli Boheman, C.H. in Schönherr, C.J., 1836 c
 Heilipus roeselii Boheman, 1835 c
 Heilipus rufescens Boheman, 1835 c
 Heilipus rufipes Boheman, 1835 c
 Heilipus rufirostris Dejean, 1830 c
 Heilipus rugicollis Boheman, 1835 c
 Heilipus ruptus Marshall, 1949 c
 Heilipus rusticanus Boheman, 1835 c
 Heilipus rusticus Boheman, 1835 c
 Heilipus sahlbergi Boheman, 1843 c
 Heilipus saxosus Boheman, 1843 c
 Heilipus scabripennis Boheman, 1835 c
 Heilipus scalaris Westwood, 1837 c
 Heilipus scapha Boheman, 1835 c
 Heilipus schmidtii Boheman, 1843 c
 Heilipus schoenherri Boheman, 1835 c
 Heilipus scrobicollis Boheman, 1835 c
 Heilipus scrobiculatus Mannerheim, 1843 c
 Heilipus semiamictus Boheman, 1843 c
 Heilipus semivittatus Boheman, 1843 c
 Heilipus septus Marshall, 1949 c
 Heilipus signatipennis Blanchard, E. in Gay, 1851 c
 Heilipus similis Hustache, 1938 c
 Heilipus sinuatus Boheman, 1843 c
 Heilipus spathulatus Germar, 1824 c
 Heilipus spinosus Dejean, 1830 c
 Heilipus squamosus Boheman, 1835 c
 Heilipus stellifer Boheman, 1835 c
 Heilipus stellimicans Boheman, 1835 c
 Heilipus stempelmanni Voss, 1943 c
 Heilipus stigma Boheman, 1835 c
 Heilipus stratioticus Boheman, 1835 c
 Heilipus strator Boheman, 1835 c
 Heilipus subcostatus Boheman, 1843 c
 Heilipus subfasciatus Blanchard, E. in Gay, 1851 c
 Heilipus submaculatus Boheman, 1835 c
 Heilipus subpartitus Boheman, 1843 c
 Heilipus taciturnus Boheman, 1843 c
 Heilipus testudo Schoenherr, 1843 c
 Heilipus tomentosus Guérin-Méneville, 1844 c
 Heilipus trachypterus Schoenherr, 1825 c
 Heilipus tricarinatus Boheman, 1843 c
 Heilipus tricolor Perty, 1832 c
 Heilipus trifasciatus (Fabricius, J.C., 1787) c g
 Heilipus tripunctatus Chevrolat, 1840 g
 Heilipus troglodytes Boheman, 1835 c
 Heilipus tuberculatus Boheman, 1835 c
 Heilipus tuberculosus Perty, 1832 c
 Heilipus tugusti Boheman, 1843 c
 Heilipus turrialbae Champion, 1925 c
 Heilipus undabundus Boheman, 1835 c
 Heilipus unguiculatus Boheman, 1843 c
 Heilipus urosus Boheman, 1843 c
 Heilipus ustulatus Schoenherr, 1835 c
 Heilipus variegatus Perty, 1832 c
 Heilipus velamen Boheman, 1835 c
 Heilipus ventralis Hustache, 1938 c
 Heilipus verrucosus Erichson, 1847 c
 Heilipus vicinus Hustache, 1924 c
 Heilipus viduus Guérin-Méneville, 1844 c
 Heilipus westringii Boheman, 1843 c
 Heilipus wiedemanni Boheman, 1835 c
 Heilipus yatahyensis Hustache, 1924 c
 Heilipus zetterstedtii Boheman, 1843 c
 Heilipus ziegleri Boheman, 1843 c
 Heilipus zonatus Boheman, 1843 c
 Heilipus zoubkoffii Boheman, 1843 c

Data sources: i = ITIS, c = Catalogue of Life, g = GBIF, b = Bugguide.net

References

Heilipus
Articles created by Qbugbot